Fauville-en-Caux is a former commune in the Seine-Maritime department in the Normandy region in northern France. On 1 January 2017, it was merged into the new commune Terres-de-Caux.

Geography

Heraldry

Population

Places of interest
 The church of St.Jean, dating from the thirteenth century.

Notable people
 Marius Grout (1903-1946), was a French writer

See also
Communes of the Seine-Maritime department

References

Former communes of Seine-Maritime